La Revolución (English: The Revolution) is the sixth studio album, and ninth overall, album by Puerto Rican reggaeton duo Wisin & Yandel. It was released on May 26, 2009 by Machete Music and WY Records. The album features collaborations with rapper 50 Cent, Ivy Queen, Yaviah, Ednita Nazario and Yomo. The album became a success in the United States and a bigger hit in Latin America. It won the Latin Music Award for Latin Rhythm Album of the Year at the 2010 Latin Billboard Music Awards. To promote the album the artists embarked on the La Revolución Tour in the US.

Background
The album is reported to incorporate the more older styles and sounds of Wisin & Yandel's music, tracing back to when they first started to produce music. This was confirmed by Wisin to the EFE Agency in Argentina, he confirmed that "It'll be a return to our origins; It'll have everything."

Commercial performance
In the United States, the first week prediction were between 25-30k. La Revolución debuted at number seven on the Billboard 200 with sales of 35,700,  making it the highest debut for a Spanish language recording act since Maná's Amar es Combatir and Shakira's Fijación Oral Vol. 1, both albums debuted and peaked at number four. It was the second best selling latin album of 2009 in the United States selling 204,000 copies. Following the 2009`s Latin Grammy Awards ceremony, where the duo won Best Urban Song, album sales increased by 81% the next week in the United States.

Following the reissue of the album, La Revolucion: Evolucion, the album bounds back from ten to number one at Billboard Latin Albums with 10,000 units sold with a 365% increased.

Worldwide, the album sold 100,000 copies in it first week.

Track listing

La Revolución: Evolution
La Revolución: Evolution (English: The Revolution: Evolution) is a re-issue edition of the album released on November 23, 2009. It comes with 2 CDs with the first disc containing the 15 tracks from the standard edition and disc 2 containing 8 new tracks. It also featured a DVD with four Music Videos.

Personnel
Adapted from album's liner notes:
 General Producers: Juan Luis Morera "Wisin" / Llandel Veguilla "Yandel"
 Executive Producers: Juan Luis Morera "Wisin" / Llandel Veguilla "Yandel" / Edgar Andino
 Musical Producers: Ernesto F. Padilla "Nesty La Mente Maestra" / Victor Martinez "El Nasi" / Jose Gomez "Profesor Gomez" / Marcos Masis "Tainy" / Christian M. Colon "Vagabundo" / Raymond Diaz "Memo"
 Recording Studio: La Mente Maestra Studio (Barranquitas, Puerto Rico) / Spectrum Studio
 Recording: Victor Martinez "El Nasi"
 Production Coordinator: Ana J. Alvarado
 Mixing: Mario de Jesus "Marioso"
 Mixing Assistant: Luis "Luisito" Lopez, Kiko Hurtado, Yamil Martinez
 Mixing Studio: Mas Audio Production
 Mastering: Sterling Sound
 Creative Direction/Design/Digital Post-Production: Iancarlo "Conqui" Reyes
 Photography: Andres Hernandez
 Stylist: Ed Coriano
 Managing Team: Andino Marketing / Edgar Andino / Paco Lopez
50 Cent appears courtesy of Shady/Aftermath/Interscope Record. 
Yomo appears courtesy of Black Pearl International Records, Inc.  
Ednita Nazario appears courtesy of Sony Music Entertainment US Latin. 
Yaviah appears courtesy of Pina Records. 
Ivy Queen appears courtesy of Drama Records.

Charts and sales

Weekly charts

Year-end charts

Sales and certifications

Accolades

See also
List of number-one Billboard Latin Rhythm Albums of 2010

References

External links
 (WYMusic)
 (WYMusic)
 (WYMusic)
index

2009 albums
Wisin & Yandel albums
Machete Music albums
Albums produced by Luny Tunes